In cryptography, an adversary's advantage is a measure of how successfully it can attack a cryptographic algorithm, by distinguishing it from an idealized version of that type of algorithm.  Note that in this context, the "adversary" is itself an algorithm and not a person.  A cryptographic algorithm is considered secure if no adversary has a non-negligible advantage, subject to specified bounds on the adversary's computational resources (see concrete security).  "Negligible" usually means "within O(2−p)" where p is a security parameter associated with the algorithm.  For example, p might be the number of bits in a block cipher's key.

Description of concept 

Let F be an oracle for the function being studied, and let G be an oracle for an idealized function of that type.  The adversary A is a probabilistic algorithm, given F or G as input, and which outputs 1 or 0.  A's job is to distinguish F from G, based on making queries to the oracle that it's given.  We say:

Examples 
Let F be a random instance of the DES block cipher.  This cipher has 64-bit blocks and a 56-bit key.  The key therefore selects one of a family of 256 permutations on the 264 possible 64-bit blocks.  A "random DES instance" means our oracle F computes DES using some key K (which is unknown to the adversary) where K is selected from the 256 possible keys with equal probability.

We want to compare the DES instance with an idealized 64-bit block cipher, meaning a permutation selected at random from the (264)! possible permutations on 64-bit blocks. Viewed another way, G is an instance of a "cipher" whose "key length" is about 1021 bits, which again is too large to fit in a computer. (We can, however, implement G with storage space proportional to the number of queries, using a random oracle).

Note that because the oracles were given encrypt plaintext of our choosing, we're modelling a chosen-plaintext attack or CPA, and the advantage we're calculating can be called the CPA-advantage of a given adversary.  If we also had decryption oracles available, we'd be doing a chosen-ciphertext attack or CCA and finding the CCA-advantage of the adversary.

Example 1: Guess at random
Call this adversary A0.  It simply flips a coin and returns 1 or 0 with equal probability and without making any oracle calls.  Thus, Pr[A0(F)=1] and Pr[A0(G)=1] are both 0.5.  The difference between these probabilities is zero, so Adv(A0) is zero.  The same thing applies if we always return 0, or always return 1: the probability is the same for both F and G, so the advantage is zero.  This adversary can't tell F and G apart.  If we're cipher designers, our desire (maybe not achievable) is to make it so that it's computationally infeasible for any  adversary to do significantly better than this.  We will have succeeded if we can make a cipher for which there's no distinguisher faster than brute force search.

Example 2: Brute force search
This adversary (call it A1) will attempt to cryptanalyze its input by brute force.  It has its own DES implementation.  It gives a single query to its oracle, asking for the 64-bit string of all zeroes to be encrypted.  Call the resulting ciphertext E0.  It then runs an exhaustive key search.
The algorithm looks like this:

  E0 = oracle_query(0)
  for k in 0,1,...,256-1:
    if DESk(0) == E0: 
       return 1
  return 0

This searches the entire 56-bit DES keyspace and returns "1" if it probably finds a matching key.  In practice, several plaintexts are required to confirm the key, as two different keys can result in one or more matching plaintext-ciphertext pairs.  If no key is found, it returns 0.

If the input oracle is DES, this exhaustive search is certain to find the key, so Pr[A1(F)=1] = 1.  If the input oracle is a random permutation, there are 264 possible values of E0, and at most 256 of them will get examined in the DES keysearch.  So the probability of A1 returning 1 is at most 2−8.  That is: 

, so

so the advantage is at least about 0.996.  This is a near-certain distinguisher, but it's not a security failure because it's no faster than brute force search, after all, it is the brute force search.

See also
Pseudorandom-function advantage
Key-recovery advantage
PR-CPA advantage

References 

 Phillip Rogaway and Mihir Bellare, Introduction to Modern Cryptography
 Oded Goldreich, Foundations of Cryptography

Theory of cryptography